Jitiri is a  volcano in the Andes, located  in the Cordillera Occidental of Bolivia in the Oruro Department, Sajama Province, Turco Municipality, Cosapa Canton. It is situated south-east of the extinct Sajama volcano, between the volcano Chullkani in the south-west and the village Cosapa in the north-east.

See also
 Asu Asuni
 Laram Q'awa 
 Kunturiri
 Uyarani

References 

Volcanoes of Oruro Department